Stigmella galactacma is a moth of the family Nepticulidae. The genus was erected by Franz von Paula Schrank in 1802. It was described by Edward Meyrick in 1924. It is found in South Africa (it was described from Weenen in Natal, now KwaZulu-Natal).

References

Endemic moths of South Africa
Nepticulidae
Moths of Africa
Moths described in 1924